Bagwali Pokhar is a village in the Dwarahat area of Almora district in Uttarakhand state of India. It is about 367 km from New Delhi. The PIN code is 263621.

Education 
There are a few schools in Bagwali Pokhar. These are - Saraswati Shisu Mandir Bagwali Pokhar, Government Inter College Bagwali Pokhar and Government Girls Inter college Bagwali Pokhar.

Bagwali pokhar is a Hill Area.

References 

Almora district